Vijith Nambiar (born 9 December 1977) is an Indian film director, music composer, playback singer, actor and producer, who works in Malayalam cinema and Tamil cinema. He made his film debut in 1995 as an assistant director in the Tamil film industry.  As a trained Carnatic singer, he started playback track singing in the Malayalam and Tamil film industries from 1995 onwards for leading musical composers and professional playback singers.

He made his original playback singing debut in 2018 with the song "Thava Chintasu"  from Anurakthi, which is world's first 3D Sanskrit movie and the movie was showcased at IFFI. Vijith made his acting debut in Anurakthi (2018). His debut in the Malayalam film industry as director and music director was in 2018 with Munthiri Monchan: Oru Thavala Paranja Kadha, an urban musical romantic comedy, which was released in September 2019.

Early life and career

Vijith Nambiar was born in Cherukunnu, Kannur District, Kerala. He started learning Carnatic music as a child, at the age of seven. Vijith Nambiar studied music under the guidance of musicians BA Chidambaranath Chennai, Thiruvilwamala Radhakrishnan and Kaithapram Vishwanathan Nambudiri.

He graduated in 1999 with a degree in mechanical engineering from the Amrita Vishwa Vidyapeetham in Coimbatore and in 2014 was working as the director of Middle East operations at Dunbar and Boardman Partnership, Ltd.

Filmography

Director

 Munthiri Monchan: Oru Thavala Paranja Kadha (2019) Malayalam
As Debutant Director Vijith Nambiar's Munthiri Monchan cast includes Manesh Krishnan, Devan, Saleema, Innocent (actor), Salim Kumar, Gopika Anil and crew. Munthiri Monchan is a romantic and a musical film filled with social liveliness. Produced by PK Asokan, written by Manu Gopal and Meharali Poilungal Ismail, Currently the Production company, Vishvas Movies set to release the movie in October 2019

Music composer

 Munthiri Monchan: Oru Thavala Paranja Kadha (2019) Malayalam

Actor

 Anurakthi  (2017) Sanskrit
 Munthiri Monchan: Oru Thavala Paranja Kadha (2019) Malayalam

Producer

 Anurakthi   (2017) Sanskrit

Playback singer

 Anurakthi   (2017) Sanskrit
Vijith Nambiar has started singing career has a professional playback track singer from 1995 onwards for leading musical composers and professional playback singers. Vijith made his original playback singing debut in 2018 with the song "Thava Chintasu"  from Anurakthi, which is world's first 3D Sanskrit movie and the movie was showcased at IFFI. Vijith Nambiar is the world's first singer to sing a Sanskrit film song in a Sanskrit movie.

Albums (non films)

Azhakil Pozhiyum, Vijith Nambiar singing the song while music given by Kalamandalam Joy Cheruvathoor.

Awards

 1997: Vijith Nambiar participated in Chembai Sangeetolsavam. 
 2014: He was given an Amrita Alumni award for distinguished contribution to industry.
 2018: Awarded for best regional feature film Anurakthi in Rajastan International Film Festival, RIFF 2018 
 2020: Best debut director - Bharat Murali Award.

References

External links
 Vijith Nambiar on IMDb
 Vijith Nambiar Official Site
 Official Facebook Page

Living people
1977 births
Indian male singers
Sanskrit-language singers
Indian male film actors
People from Kannur district
Malayalam film producers
Malayalam film directors
21st-century Indian film directors
21st-century Indian male actors
Singers from Kerala
Film directors from Kerala
Film producers from Kerala
Musicians from Kannur